KLH-Arena consist of five ski jump hills in Murau, Austria. There are large, normal and three smaller hills.

History
First jumps were performed in 1933. Gumpold-Schanze normal hill was opened in 1936 and Hans-Walland Großschanze large hill in 1968 one FIS Ski jumping World Cup event in 1994 on large hill.

World Cup

Men

Ski jumping venues in Austria
Sports venues in Styria
Sports venues completed in 1936
Sports venues completed in 1968
1936 establishments in Austria
1968 establishments in Austria
Murau District